The Teg is a small stream in southern England, in the county of Berkshire. It rises in Burghfield Common and flows northwards and then eastwards to join Burghfield Brook, a tributary of Foudry Brook.

Route
The Teg is a freshwater stream originating rises close to the Willink School in the west of Burghfield Common, an area of post-war housing located on a plateau that forms the largest population centre of the parish of Burghfield, and which takes its name from the common land on which it was built. The stream flowed out from a rectangular pond, which in 1911 covered , and headed north-eastwards, between some housing and gravel pits. There was a triangular pond covering  before it reached the south-eastern edge of Scratchface Copse. This section has largely been built over by planned housing estates constructed from the 1960s onwards, and even the rectangular pond has been truncated at its southern end. The brook reappears to the north of Hawksworth Road, and forms an important wildlife corridor within the village.

The stream continues through Pondhouse Copse before turning to the east and passing through the southern edge of Burghfield Village, another of Burghfield's population centres. It is culverted beneath two houses and Reading Road and then runs east for a while, skirting south of Burghfield Manor and St.Marys Church. The main section of the church building was constructed in Romanesque style by J.B. Lacey in 1843, but when Bodley and Garner added a chancel in 1892, they built it in Decorated style. Despite the recent date of the structure, it contains a carved wood effigy of Sir Roger de Burfield, dating from the 14th century, a font originally from the 12th century, but re-carved in the 14th, and some 15th century stone effigies. The east window contains stained glass made by Burlison and Grylls.

The stream turns briefly to the north-east towards Pingewood, before resuming its eastward course, in managed agricultural drainage channels. At Amners Wood, it is joined by a stream on its right bank, flowing out of the Atomic Weapons Establishment, Burghfield.  of farmland from the Burghfield Place Farm Estate were requisitioned in 1938 by the Ministry of Defence, so that they could build a Royal Ordnance Factory. ROF Burghfield was a filling factory, used for the storage and deployment of armaments, and was served by a siding from the Reading to Basingstoke railway. In 1954, the site changed hands, becoming part of the Atomic Weapons Establishment, and was responsible for the assembly of Blue Steel nuclear missiles, which became operational in 1961. The site still assembles, maintains and decommissions Britain's nuclear weapons.

When it reaches the eastern boundary of the establishment, The Teg passes under Burnthouse Lane and continues in a straight channel between flooded gravel pits, before passing under the Reading to Basingstoke railway and joining Burghfield Brook on its left bank, near Hopkiln Farm. A short distance afterwards, Burghfield Brook passes under Kybes Lane and enters Foudry Brook.

Bibliography

References

Rivers of Berkshire
2Teg